Canemount is a 1,100-acre plantation with a historic mansion in Alcorn, Mississippi, U.S., a mile and a half away from Alcorn State University. It has been listed on the National Register of Historic Places since December 2, 1982.

References

Houses on the National Register of Historic Places in Mississippi
Italianate architecture in Mississippi
National Register of Historic Places in Claiborne County, Mississippi
Plantations in Mississippi